The Eurovision Young Dancers 1993 was the fifth edition of the Eurovision Young Dancers, held at the Dance House in Stockholm, Sweden on 15 June 1993. Organised by the European Broadcasting Union (EBU) and host broadcaster Sveriges Television (SVT), dancers from eight countries participated in the televised final. A total of fifteen countries took part in the competition.

As in 1989 and 1991, a semi-final was held to choose the finalists. The semi-final took place 2 days before the final (13 June 1993). The jury chose the finalists and top 3 performances. The prizes were presented by Princess Christina, the youngest sister of Carl XVI Gustaf, King of Sweden.

The non-qualified countries were Belgium, Cyprus, Finland, Italy, Norway, Portugal and Slovenia. Zenaida Yanowsky of Spain won the contest, with Switzerland and Austria and France placing second and joint third respectively.

Location

The Dance House in Stockholm, Sweden, was the host venue for the 1993 edition of the Eurovision Young Dancers.

Format
The format consists of dancers who are non-professional and between the ages of 16–21, competing in a performance of dance routines of their choice, which they have prepared in advance of the competition. All of the acts then take part in a choreographed group dance during 'Young Dancers Week'.

Jury members of a professional aspect and representing the elements of ballet, contemporary, and modern dancing styles, score each of the competing individual and group dance routines. The overall winner upon completion of the final dances is chosen by the professional jury members.

As in 1991, the interval featured a documentary about the dancers that did not make it to the final.

Results

Preliminary round
A total of fifteen countries took part in the preliminary round of the 1993 contest, of which eight qualified to the televised grand final. The following countries failed to qualify.

Final
Awards were given to the top three countries. The table below highlights these using gold, silver, and bronze. The placing results of the remaining participants is unknown and never made public by the European Broadcasting Union.

Jury members 
The jury members consisted of the following:

  – Nils-Åke Häggbom (Head of Jury)
  – Birgit Cullberg
  – Frank Andersen
 / – Gigi Gheorghe Caciuleanu
  – Paolo Bortoluzzi
  – Peter Van Dyk
  – María de Ávila
  – Heinz Spoerli
  – Micha Van Hoecke
  – Pierre Lacotte
  – Elsa-Marianne von Rosen
  – Elisabetta Terabust
  – Jorma Uotinen

Broadcasting
The 1993 Young Dancers competition was broadcast in at least 15 countries.

See also
 Eurovision Song Contest 1993

References

External links 
 

Eurovision Young Dancers by year
1993 in Sweden
June 1993 events in Europe
Events in Stockholm